Mayfield Falls is a waterfall in Jamaica that comprises twenty one widely spaced small cascades on the Mayfield River, a tributary of the Cabarita River. Mayfield Falls is in Glenbrook Westmoreland Jamaica.

References

Waterfalls of Jamaica
Geography of Westmoreland Parish
Tourist attractions in Westmoreland Parish